Maria is a 1947 Swedish drama film directed by Gösta Folke and starring Maj-Britt Nilsson, George Fant and Stig Järrel.  It was made at the Centrumateljéerna Studios in Stockholm. The film's sets were designed by the art director Bibi Lindström. It was based on the 1942 novel of the same title by Gustav Sandgren.

Synopsis
A maid loses her job working for a family in a small town in Sweden. She encounters a truck driver who, after discovering she wants to be an actress, gets her a job in a film.

Cast
 Maj-Britt Nilsson as 	Maria
 George Fant as 	Åke Bengtsson
 Stig Järrel as 	Movie Director Harry Sörbom
 Elof Ahrle as 	Max Andersson
 Georg Skarstedt as 	Carl Carlbom
 Åke Claesson as 	Gus Pettersson
 Agneta Prytz as 	Birgitta Bertner
 Nils Hallberg as 	Frasse
 Mimi Nelson as 	Sylvia
 Carl Deurell as 	Westlander
 Carl Reinholdz as 	Mechanic
 Torsten Bergström as Jonatan, Actor
 Hans Dahlin as 	Olsson, Actor
 Ivar Wahlgren as Lundgren, Actor 
 David Erikson as Maria's Employer
 Anders Nyström as 	Bell Boy 
 Hanny Schedin as Hat Shop Clerk 
 Göran Strindberg as 	Photographer

References

Bibliography 
 Goble, Alan. The Complete Index to Literary Sources in Film. Walter de Gruyter, 1999.

External links 
 

1947 films
Swedish drama films
1947 drama films
1940s Swedish-language films
Films directed by Gösta Folke
Films based on Swedish novels
Films about filmmaking
Films set in Stockholm
1940s Swedish films